is a Japanese-born North Korean footballer currently playing as a forward for FC Imabari.

Career statistics

Club
.

Notes

References

1998 births
Living people
Waseda University alumni
Japanese footballers
North Korean footballers
North Korea youth international footballers
Association football forwards
J3 League players
Omiya Ardija players
FC Imabari players